Dom Otdykha is the name of several rural localities in Russia.

Dom Otdykha, Bryansk Oblast, a settlement in Krasnorogsky Rural Administrative Okrug of Pochepsky District in Bryansk Oblast; 
Dom Otdykha, Penza Oblast, an inhabited locality in Nizhnelipovsky Selsoviet of Sosnovoborsky District in Penza Oblast
Dom otdykha, Tyumen Oblast, a settlement in Klepikovsky Rural Okrug of Ishimsky District in Tyumen Oblast
Dom otdykha, Volgograd Oblast, a settlement under the administrative jurisdiction of the town of district significance of Kalach-na-Donu in Kalachyovsky District of Volgograd Oblast